The Loucherhorn is a mountain of the Bernese Alps, overlooking Lake Brienz in the Bernese Oberland. It is located east of the Schynige Platte.

References

External links
 
 Loucherhorn on Hikr

Mountains of the Alps
Mountains of Switzerland
Mountains of the canton of Bern
Two-thousanders of Switzerland